Mirko Krstičević is a Croatian musical composer. He is a regular member of the Croatian Composer Society and the Croatian Society of Film Workers. He was the founder and bassist of the band METAK.

 From 2000 to 2008 he cooperated with the Tourist Board of Split on the project „Musical city squares“ inventing and organizing around one hundred musical and cultural events a year.
 From 2004 to 2007 he was secretary of the Split philharmonic society. 
 In 2007 he established the Split society for contemporary music and the project *SPLITHESIS, which gathers seven composers of contemporary music from Split, twelve musicians and a conductor.
 In 2015 he established “The highway to Well family”. Its purpose is to spread the gospel through music.

As a composer, musician and producer he cooperated with many rock and pop bands and singers. His compositions have been performed in about a dozen countries.

Lives and works in Split.

Education 
Krstičević graduated from the Theory of Music at the Pedagogical Academy at Split and then at the Music Academy in Sarajevo. He studied composition in the masterclasses of Mladen Pozajić and Miroslav Špiler.

Career 
After graduating, Krstičević worked as a musical professor at the University of Split for a short period of time and later became a freelance artist. He has composed a total of 38 hours of music and has sold a total of 3 million CDs.

Classical music 
30 (pieces for solo instruments; chamber and symphonic music)

Opera 

 1997. Blood wedding;
 1999. Halugica;

Ballet opera 

 2018. Dan'zor – Atlantis: A Legend of Dan’zor

Performing music 

 130 theatre shows
 45 films
 1 TV show (children’s)
 2 musicals (children’s)

Rock and Pop music 

 42 pieces
 150 arrangement/orchestrations
 12 albums (producer)

Established and played in the rock band METAK (1978-1981). There were one of the opening acts before Bijelo Dugme concert for 70.000 people in 1979. His most successful year was 1980 with METAK. Among the top five bands. His most successful song was "Da mi je biti morski pas“ (music:M. Krstičević, lyrics:M. Popadić),1980. It was the best-selling single and the most performed song on all TV and radio stations of the former Yugoslavia.|

Recognition 

 Croatian Academy of Arts and Science Charter and the SLUK award for the best music (puppet opera Halugica, 1999.).
 Slobodna Dalmacija Special Award for the Arts (2010.). 
 Silvije Bombardelli award for exceptional contribution to the Croatian art of composing contemporary music (2013.) 
 Member of the Croatian Composer Society and the Croatian Society of Film Workers.

References

External links 

 Atlantida - Legenda o Dan'zoru 
 The highway to Well family
 HDS, Croatian composer society
 ZAMP, croatian base of authors
 Discogs, music database
 Da mi je biti morski pas

Croatian composers
Croatian classical musicians
Music arrangers
Living people
Year of birth missing (living people)